Herpetopoma alarconi is a species of sea snail, a marine gastropod mollusk in the family Chilodontidae.

Description
The size of the shell varies between 3.8 mm and 5 mm.

Distribution
This species is found in the Pacific Ocean off Easter Island.

References

External links
 To Biodiversity Heritage Library (1 publication)
 To World Register of Marine Species
 

alarconi
Gastropods described in 1980